There are various lists of communities in Ontario, grouped by status, type or location:

List of census subdivisions in Ontario - counties, districts and regional municipalities
List of cities in Ontario - places which are incorporated as cities
List of francophone communities in Ontario - places which are designated as French language service areas due to having a significant minority or majority Franco-Ontariao population
List of municipalities in Ontario - all incorporated municipalities in the province regardless of type
List of population centres in Ontario - urban areas, without regard to municipal boundaries
List of towns in Ontario - places which are incorporated as towns
List of township municipalities in Ontario - places with the municipal status of township
List of unincorporated communities in Ontario - places which are not incorporated, but exist as neighbourhoods or settlements inside larger municipal entities
List of villages in Ontario - places which are incorporated as villages

Communities